Dorcadion formosum is a species of beetle in the family Cerambycidae. It was described by Kraatz in 1870. It is known from Turkey.

References

formosum
Beetles described in 1870